The 1978 World Snooker Championship (also known as the 1978 Embassy World Snooker Championship for the purposes of sponsorship) was a professional ranking snooker tournament that took place between 17 and 29 April 1978 at the Crucible Theatre in Sheffield, England.

The final was contested by Ray Reardon and Perrie Mans. Reardon led 5–2 after the first session, before Mans levelled the match at 8–8 after the first day's play. After the third interval Reardon led 12–11 and won the 24th frame with a 64 break to lead 13–11. After the second day Reardon led 18–14, and eventually won the match 25–18. Reardon became the oldest winner of the World Championship aged 45 years and 203 days, passing the previous record of Joe Davis who was aged 45 years and 33 days in 1946. This record stood until 2022 when Ronnie O'Sullivan won his seventh world title aged 46 years and 148 days. This was Reardon's sixth and last world title. The tournament was sponsored by cigarette manufacturer  Embassy.

Overview
The World Snooker Championship is an annual professional snooker tournament organised by the World Professional Billiards and Snooker Association (WPBSA). Founded in the late 19th century by British Army soldiers stationed in India, the cue sport was popular in the British Isles. However, in the modern era, which started in 1969 when the World Championship reverted to a knockout format, it has become increasingly popular worldwide, especially in East and Southeast Asian nations such as China, Hong Kong and Thailand.

Joe Davis won the first World Championship in 1927, hosted by the Billiards Association and Control Council, the final match being held at Camkin's Hall in Birmingham, England. Since 1977, the event has been held at the Crucible Theatre in Sheffield, England. The 1978 championship featured sixteen professional players competing in one-on-one snooker matches in a single-elimination format, each match played over several . These competitors in the main tournament were selected using a combination of the top players in the snooker world rankings and the winners of a pre-tournament qualification stage.

Tournament summary
 This was the first championship to have daily BBC coverage as highlights.
 Defending champion John Spencer became the first player to suffer the Crucible curse, when he lost 8–13 to Perrie Mans in the first round.
 Ray Reardon became the oldest ever World Champion at the age of 45 years and 203 days, while Fred Davis became the oldest semi-finalist at the age of 64 years and 251 days, losing 16–18 to Perrie Mans.
 John Williams refereed the final.

Prize fund
The breakdown of prize money for this year is shown below: 
 Winner: £7,500
 Runner-up: £3,500
 Third place: £2,500
 Fourth place: £2,000
 Quarter-final: £1,000
 Last 16: £500
 Highest break: £500
 Maximum break: £10,000
 Total: £24,000

Main draw
Numbers in (parentheses) indicate seedings.

Sources:

Qualifying
Source:

Century breaks 
There were seven century breaks at championship, the highest being 138 by John Spencer. 
 138, 118  John Spencer
 119, 100  Ray Reardon
 108  Eddie Charlton
 105  Fred Davis
 105  Patsy Fagan

References

1978
World Championship
World Snooker Championship
Sports competitions in Sheffield
World Snooker Championship